Standing on the Corner may refer to:

 "Standing on the Corner" (show tune), 1956 song written by Frank Loesser
 "Standing on the Corner (Blue Yodel No. 9)", 1930 song by Jimmie Rodgers, featuring Louis Armstrong
Standing on the Corner (band), an American experimental Jazz band

See also
 Standin' on the Corner Park, a public park in Winslow, Arizona